Woodend Hospital is a health facility located in the Woodend area of Aberdeen, Scotland. It is managed by NHS Grampian.

History
The hospital, which was designed by Brown & Watt, opened as the Old Mill Poorhouse and Infirmary in May 1907. It became a military hospital during the First World War. The hospital was taken over by Aberdeen Town Council and reopened as Woodend Municipal Hospital in October 1927. A special block was erected for the treatment of non-pulmonary tuberculosis, pneumonia and similar cases. A new nurses' home was added in 1936 and the hospital joined the National Health Service in 1948. During the 1964 Aberdeen typhoid outbreak, over 400 cases were diagnosed and the patients were quarantined at the City Hospital and Woodend Hospital, although no fatalities resulted.

Services
The hospital provides outpatient services, elective orthopaedic surgery, rehabilitation and care of the elderly services. DOME, the Department of Medicine for the Elderly, which forms a base for University of Aberdeen geriatric medicine students is located at the hospital. Several out-patient clinics are also based at the hospital.

References

Hospital buildings completed in 1927
Hospitals in Aberdeen
NHS Grampian
NHS Scotland hospitals
Category B listed buildings in Aberdeen
Listed hospital buildings in Scotland